Afroneutria is a genus of spiders in the family Ctenidae. It was first described in 2015 by Polotow & Jocqué. , it contains 6 species, all African.

Species

Afroneutria comprises the following species:
Afroneutria erythrochelis (Simon, 1876)
Afroneutria hybrida Polotow & Jocqué, 2015
Afroneutria immortalis (Arts, 1912)
Afroneutria quadrimaculata Polotow & Jocqué, 2015
Afroneutria tanga Polotow & Jocqué, 2016
Afroneutria velox (Blackwall, 1865)

References

Ctenidae
Araneomorphae genera
Spiders of Africa